Garrison Hawk (also known as "Hawkman," born 23 October 1978) is a Jamaican singer and dancehall artist. He is best known for his work on Tricky’s 2001 album Blowback. Tricky praised the collaboration, telling Billboard magazine, "Hawk is my partner, musically. It's almost like my career is changing, and I am finding all the right people to work with."

Born in Mandeville, Jamaica, Hawk was a teenager when he moved with his family to the Bronx, New York, where he cultivated a distinctive singing and rapping style. He started performing with local sound systems, and eventually shared a stage with Shabba Ranks and Super Cat on an East Coast tour in the late '90s. After releasing a series of underground singles—including "3 the Yard Way," with DJ Excel, and "Addicted" (the flip side to "An It Don’t Stop" by Smoothe da Hustler)—he received significant airplay on New York’s Hot 97 radio station and broke through on several club charts in Europe. In 1999, he was approached by producers Roger Sanchez and Armand Van Helden to perform on some club mixes for the AV8 label.

References

External links
 http://www.discogs.com/artist/Hawkman
M.O.D. Technologies website
Method of Defiance
"Sweet Music" official video
"Running Red" official video (via NME)

1978 births
Living people
Jamaican reggae singers
People from Mandeville, Jamaica
Jamaican dancehall musicians
Jamaican rappers
People from the Bronx